Agente segreto 777 - Operazione Mistero or Secret Agent 777 is a 1965 Italian spy film directed by Enrico Bomba. Its plot includes several science fiction and horror elements. The location is set in the Middle East, in Lebanon. It has a sequel, Secret Agent 777: Ticket to Die, directed by the same Bomba and released the same year.

Cast
 Tiziano Cortini as Lewis Jordan/Zaraf/Secret Agent 777 
Mark Damon as   Dr. Bardin 
Mary Young  as  Professor's Daughter 
 Seyna Seyn as   Dr. Serens 
Stelio Candelli as  Dr. Dexter (credited as Stanley Kent) 
Aldo Bufi Landi  as   Richard, the "dead man" 
Isarco Ravaioli as   Professor's Assistant 
Walter Neng   
María Badmajew  
Franca Duccio

References

External links 
 

1965 films
1960s spy thriller films
1960s Italian-language films
1960s action adventure films
Italian spy thriller films
Italian action adventure films
1960s Italian films